Live at Knuckleheads, Kansas City is an album by the Grammy winning Zydeco band Chubby Carrier and the Bayou Swamp Band recorded at Knuckleheads Saloon in Kansas City, Missouri and released in 2007.

Track listing

References

Chubby Carrier albums
2007 albums